Chazy may refer to:

Chazy, New York, a town at Lake Champlain, New York
Chazy (CDP), New York, a hamlet in the town
 Chazy Formation, a mid-Ordovician limestone deposit in northeastern North America
Chazy River, the name of two tributaries of Lake Champlain, New York
Jean Chazy (1882–1955), French mathematician
Chazy equation, a differential equation

See also

Chazz (name)